Ministry of Magic is a wizard rock band with a pop/electronica sound. The band was started in 2007 by Jason Munday and several of his friends. They have released several albums and given hundreds of performances.

In a 2010 survey carried out by Kelli Rohlman, a musicology graduate student from Texas Tech University, 98% of 125 respondents listed Ministry of Magic among their favorite wizard rock bands.

References 

Musical groups established in 2007
Wizard rock
Wizard rock musical groups